Bitte is a Nordic female given name. Notable people with the name include:

 Bitte Berg (born 1961), Swedish curler
 Bitte Kai Rand (born 1956), Danish fashion designer

See also
 
 Witte

Scandinavian feminine given names